The GP Roeselare (officially Grote Prijs van de Bank van Roeselare en West-Vlaanderen) was a post WW II-men's cycling race organized for the last time in 1976. The start and finish place was Roeselare (West Flanders, Belgium).

The competition's roll of honor includes the successes of Rik Van Looy, Patrick Sercu and Freddy Maertens.

Winners

References 

Cycle races in Belgium
Defunct cycling races in Belgium
1947 establishments in Belgium
Recurring sporting events established in 1947
Recurring sporting events disestablished in 1976
1976 disestablishments